Charter Oak is an unincorporated community in Stoddard County, in the U.S. state of Missouri. A variant spelling was "Charteroak".

History
Charter Oak had its start ca. 1900 when the railroad was extended to that point.  The community took its name from the Charteroak Land and Lumber Company. A post office called Charteroak was established in 1902, and remained in operation until 1957.

References

Unincorporated communities in Stoddard County, Missouri
Unincorporated communities in Missouri